Dinesh Vijan's horror-comedy universe is an Indian shared universe consisting of Hindi supernatural horror films. The film series began in 2018 with the release of Stree, directed by Amar Kaushik and starring Rajkumar Rao and Shraddha Kapoor. The plot is the Bangalore legend of the 1980s known as Oh Stree Nale Ba (transl. Oh woman, come tomorrow), about a spirit who knocks on people's doors at night; it received positive reviews and grossed ₹180 crore worldwide, budget of between Rs 14 crore. Later, it spawned with two big successors: Roohi in 2021 which starring Janhvi Kapoor and Rao, followed by Bhediya in 2022 starring Varun Dhawan and Kriti Sanon.

The franchise has been commercially successful, having grossed a combined ₹300 crore against a combined budget of ₹94 crore. The franchise has predominantly received positive reviews.

Overview

Stree (2018)

The people of Chanderi live under constant fear of Stree, the spirit of a woman who attacks men at night during festivals. Vicky, along with his friends, decides to unravel the mystery.

Roohi (2021)

Bhawra and Kattanni kidnap Roohi on the orders of Guniya Bhai, who wants to marry her off to his client. However, things take a paranormal turn when they realise that Roohi is possessed by a demon.

Bhediya (2022)

Bhediya revolves around the story of a werewolf, has its roots in popular folklore and is inspired by legendary tales of Arunachal Pradesh, where the movie was also shot.

Films

Stree (2018)

The first installment of the series, centers on the real-life incidents. The people of Chanderi live under constant fear of Stree, the spirit of a woman who attacks men at night during festivals. Vicky, along with his friends, decides to unravel the mystery. The film focused on the "Naale Baa" was an urban legend that went viral during the 1990s in Karnataka. The myth goes "a witch roams the streets in the night and knocks the door." "Naale Baa" has been found written on walls of small towns and villages (Rural Bangalore) for years now. Stree was released on 30 August 2018 in United Arab Emirates and 31 August 2018, in India to positive reviews. It earned ₹180 crore worldwide against a budget of ₹14 crore, becoming one of the most profitable horror films in Indian history.

Roohi (2021)

A spin-off film, focusing on the origins of the Mudiyapairi. And also second installment in this series. The plot focused on Bhawra and Kattanni kidnap Roohi on the orders of Guniya Bhai, who wants to marry her off to his client. However, things take a turn when they realise Roohi is possessed by a demon (mudiyapairi). The film is directed by Hardik Mehta and produced by Dinesh Vijan, Mrighdeep Singh Lamba. Roohi was released on 11 March 2021, gained negative response from audience and month later film released on JioCinema on 8 April and released on Netflix the next day.

Bhediya (2022)

Bhediya is another spin-off and the third installment in this series. The film starring Varun Dhawan, Kriti Sanon and Deepak Dobriyal, released worldwide on 25 November 2022. The shooting took place in regions of Arunachal Pradesh - Ziro (Lower Subansiri), Sagalee (Papum Pare) and parts of Pakke-Kessang district- over a span of two months, from  March to April 2021. Over 70 percent of the artists in Bhediya are from Arunachal Pradesh.The shooting schedule in Arunachal Pradesh completed on 19 April 2021. The film was wrapped up on 10 July 2021. Abhishek Banerjee reprises his role of Jaana from the film Stree (2018) as Bhasker's cousin. Additionally Shraddha Kapoor, Rajkummar Rao and Aparshakti Khurana appear in cameo appearances, all reprising their roles from Stree.

Upcoming films

Munjha (2023)

The fourth film in this series, the film is directed by Aditya Sarpotdar. The star cast is yet to be announced. The film will be kickstarting shooting in the first half of 2023. The film will be a standalone film and is yet to announced officially. Reportedly Sharvari Wagh was finalized for title role.

Stree 2

The fifth installment in this series, and also a sequel to Stree. The film is directed by Amar Kaushik and produced by Dinesh Vijan, featuring Shraddha Kapoor, Rajkumar Rao, Aparshakti Khurana and Abhishek Banerjee in lead roles. Varun Dhawan will also make a cameo appearance reprising his role of Bhaskar from Bhediya.

Recurring cast and characters
This table lists the main characters who appear in the D.V horror Universe, in alphabetical order by the character's last name.

Additional crew and production details

Reception

Stree (2018)

Rajeev Masand of News18 also gave 4.5 out of 5: "Stree is especially entertaining, packed with laugh-aloud moments and a cast that's on top of their game. It's one of the most original films this year, and I recommend that you make the time for it."
Rachit Gupta of The Times of India offered 4 out of 5, noting the superlative writing and dialogues, but felt the film was a little too long and had some 'ambiguous ideas.'
Raja Sen of the Hindustan Times gave it a 4 out of 5 and had a more moderate tone, commending the actor's energy and collaborative efforts but noting a rushed-feeling plot: "The laughs are inconsistent, and the plotting feels sloppy and rushed. The ideas are fine, but the writing needed work."

Roohi (2021)

Roohi received generally negative to average reviews from critics. On Rotten Tomatoes it has an approval rating of 10% based on reviews from 10 critics. Times of India gave it a rating of 3.5 stars out of 5 and said, "Roohi is an entertaining blend of laughs and thrills". Umesh Punwani of Koimoi gave the film a rating of 2.5/5 and stated "Roohi has its moments, but they're very few to label this as an entertaining product overall. The acting department shines, and the others remain to be in between from bad to moderately good". Monika Rawal Kukreja of Hindustan Times described Roohi as a "convoluted film". She praised Rao and Sharma's equation in the movie but criticised Kapoor by calling her performance average.

Box office
The franchise has been notable for its profit, with Stree and its follow-up having earned a combined profit of ₹300 crore, according to Hindustan Times.

Notes

See also
Cop Universe
Dhoom (franchise)
Tiger (franchise)
Race (film series)
Baaghi (film series)
YRF Spy Universe
 K.G.F (film series)
 Lokesh Cinematic Universe
 HIT Universe

References

External links

Stree on Hotstar
Roohi on Netflix

Film series introduced in 2018
Indian film series
Horror film franchises
Fictional universes